Novel Njweipi Chegou is a Cameroonian molecular biologist who is a professor at the Stellenbosch University Immunology Research Group. His research considers pulmonary and extrapulmonary tuberculosis. He leads the Diagnostics Research Laboratory. He was awarded the Royal Society Africa Prize in 2022.

Early life and education 
Chegou is from the Anglophone region of Cameroon. He studied medical sciences at the University of Buea and then started a degree in health sciences at Stellenbosch University. His master's research considered the immunology of tuberculosis, and he continued in the field for his doctoral research. His doctoral research identified and patented a QuantiFERON supernatant biosignature that can differentiate between active and latent Mycobacterium tuberculosis.

Research and career 
Chegou looks to develop a testing platform for tuberculosis. He has investigated different biomarkers of tuberculosis, and developed a strategy to identify tuberculosis meningitis in children and in places with limited access to resources, such as rural areas.

Awards and honours 
 2015 Stellenbosch University Rector's Award
 2015 UNESCO-MARS award
 2019 South African Medical Research Council Silver award 
 2019 NSTF-South32 Awards
 2022 Royal Society Africa Prize

Selected publications

References 

Living people
Cameroonian scientists
Stellenbosch University alumni
University of Buea alumni
Academic staff of Stellenbosch University
Cameroonian emigrants to South Africa
Year of birth missing (living people)